James Ingall Wedgwood (24 March 1883 – 13 March 1951) was the first Presiding Bishop of the Liberal Catholic Church.

Wedgwood was a former Anglican, a member of the Theosophical Society and a member of a co-Masonic order. His work on the Liberal Rite, as well as his efforts to establish a progressive church, are his greatest legacies.

Early years
Wedgwood was born in London in 1883, the son of Alfred Allen Wedgwood, son of Hensleigh Wedgwood and Rosina Margaret Ingall. He was a descendant of Josiah Wedgwood, Master-Potter of Etruria. In 1894 he was sent to Windlesham House School, leaving for Brighton College in 1897. He studied organ construction and became an organist at 14; before 18 was already an authority, writing many standard texts. He then studied at University College, Nottingham, with the intention of making a living as a chemist, but found himself attracted to High Anglican worship, becoming an altar server and later being sent to York Minster, where as choirmaster he trained boys in plainchant. As an Anglo-Catholic he became a member of the Confraternity of the Blessed Sacrament.

Theosophy and Co-Masonry
In 1904 Wedgwood attended a lecture on Theosophy given by Annie Besant in York. Having heard her once previously in Nottingham, he determined to end his interest in Theosophy by attending a second lecture and ridding himself of "that woman". Three days later he joined the Theosophical Society and was forbidden to return to the church. Citing the local canon, he wrote: "The Vicar could not have such a heretic as a church official!"  He gave up the idea of ever having a career in the church and decided to dedicate himself to the work of the Theosophical Society and serving as General Secretary of the Society in England and Wales from 1911 to 1913, resigning only to join the British Jurisdiction of the Co-Masonic Order.

Old Catholic Church of Great Britain

In 1913, Wedgwood took notice of the Old Catholic Church in England and wrote a letter to Archbishop Arnold Harris Mathew. Mathew’s reply caught him somewhat by surprise and rekindled his interest in both the church and in entering holy orders again. They exchanged letters for a time and Wedgwood explained his affiliation to the Theosophical Society. Mathew did not express any concern over the matter at the time. The same year, Wedgwood was rebaptised and reconfirmed sub-conditione, received the Minor Orders including subdeacon. He was later ordained a deacon and finally a priest on 22 July 1913 in London.

In 1915, Wedgwood visited Australia as Grand Secretary of the Order of Universal CoMasonry and met Charles Webster Leadbeater, a leading figure in the Theosophical movement. He initiated Leadbeater into Freemasonry and talked about his ordination to the priesthood in the Old Catholic Church. In his words: “I talked with him about my ordination and he came to various celebrations of the Eucharist by myself. He was greatly impressed by the power for good which such ordination bestowed and with the splendid scope that the celebration offered for spreading spiritual blessing abroad on the world.”

Founding the Liberal Catholic Church

On his return to England, Wedgwood learned that one of the bishops of the church, Frederick Samuel Willoughby, had become enmeshed in a homosexuality scandal and as a result had been suspended by Archbishop Mathew. He also learned that Mathew wanted all the clergy of the church to renounce Theosophy as he had heard from a non-Theosophical priest that the beliefs of the society were incompatible. Few bothered to reply to Mathew and shortly thereafter Mathew "dissolved" his church. Bishop Willoughby offered to consecrate Wedgwood to the episcopate in order to guard the apostolic succession as he had received it. Wedgwood, however, aware that the charges against Willoughby were substantially true, approached a number of other bishops seeking consecration. He wrote to the Old Catholic Archbishop of Utrecht, by whom Mathew had originally been consecrated, but received no reply. He then approached Bishop Frederick James, a fellow Theosophist and homosexual and a number of other freelance bishops, but none would oblige. With no other options open, Wedgwood received from Willoughby, King and Gauntlett the apostolic succession on 13 February 1916. This took place only after Archbishop Mathew had dissolved the Old Catholic Church in Great Britain and published a letter in The Times announcing his intention to join the Roman Catholic Church.

Later that year Wedgwood again travelled to Australia where he consecrated Leadbeater a bishop in Sydney on 22 July 1916. Leadbeater eventually succeeded Wedgwood as Presiding Bishop of the LCC. From that time forward Wedgwood travelled the world as a missionary bishop, creating the Liberal Rite (a form of Christian liturgy) in co-operation with Leadbeater, establishing missions of the church and publishing a stream of works on theology and liturgy including New Insights into Christian Worship, The Presence of Christ in the Holy Communion, Meditation for Beginners, Varieties of Psychism, The Larger Meaning of Religion, Open Letter to the Archbishop of Canterbury, The Lambeth Conference and The Validity of Archbishop’s Mathew’s Orders.

Twilight years

Wedgwood was a homosexual with what he described as an "almost unbelievably strong" sexual urge (he once visited 18 public toilets in two hours, explaining to police that he had been "searching for a friend"). This was matched by a strong religious strain, and he was dominated by those two fundamental, but often conflicting, drives. In 1919, together with several other priests and bishops of the Liberal Catholic Church, he came under investigation for sexual activities involving boys. The scandals continued through the following years, leading to Wedgwood's resignation from the Theosophical Society and various other bodies and organisations including the Liberal Catholic Church (12 March 1923), announcing in a letter to Annie Besant of the Theosophical Society that he would henceforth retire into private life.

Wedgwood then enrolled as a doctoral candidate at the Sorbonne, combining his studies with experiments at the works of a celebrated organ builder and  activities at Russian Orthodox and Old Catholic churches. Whilst in Paris, he became addicted to cocaine, which he used in quantity, smuggling it into England on his visits concealed in the head of his bishop's crozier. Whilst he was in Paris, the symptoms of secondary syphilis manifested themselves – he had contracted the disease as the result of oral sex in Sydney but had refused to admit the fact or to take any treatment.

By 1924, with money running short, Wedgwood approached his old friend Annie Besant and through her influence again became involved with the church in Huizen, Netherlands, where he was offered a house and estate for his use. A small chapel was built and dedicated to St Michael and All Angels, where Wedgwood began to celebrate regular services. He also resumed his activities with the Theosophical Society, with increasingly frequent claimed visions and meetings with masters, angels, archangels and denizens of the higher realms.

Death and tributes 

Wedgwood died on 13 March 1951 in Farnham, Surrey, from a fall which broke several ribs and ruptured a lung. In the years before his death he continued to wander in and out of the dementia of tertiary syphilis, in the lucid periods devoting himself to the work of the centre at Huizen and to the establishment of a lesser centre at Tekels Park near Camberley, Surrey, in England, where he lived almost entirely from 1937 onwards. These periods became less and less over the years and during his last months he had to be kept from any involvement in public activities, even from eating in the communal dining room, because of his unpredictable behaviour.

His death brought eulogies from his most devoted followers. Bishop Vreede wrote:

Privately, even his friends were more equivocal. E. L. Gardner, an eminent British Theosophist who was responsible for arranging for Wedgwood to be looked after in his declining years, wrote privately, "JIW was a 'dual' - at times skilled, able and impressive. Then a bout of sensualism of the worst grade, sexual perversion."

Others remembered him differently. This is what Oscar Köllerström wrote in his tribute to Bishop Wedgwood (The Liberal Catholic, July 1951):

See also

 Liberal Catholic Church International

Notes

Further reading
The Liturgy of the Liberal Catholic Rite, 3rd Ed.
The Collected Works of James I. Wedgwood, Msgr. T.J. Howard ed., 
Leadbeater, C.W. The Science of the Sacraments.

External links
 James I Wedgwood
 Liberal Catholic Church International
 Liberal Catholic documents and rites at the Global Library
 Universal Catholic Church
 St. Francis Universal Catholic Church, San Diego California
 CWL World - The Liberal Catholic Church

1883 births
1951 deaths
Bishops of Independent Catholic denominations
LGBT bishops
People educated at Windlesham House School
People educated at Brighton College
English Theosophists
Former Anglicans
Liberal Catholicism
English LGBT people